The keeled sideband, scientific name Monadenia circumcarinata, is a medium-sized species of air-breathing land snail, a terrestrial pulmonate gastropod mollusk in the family Monadeniidae. This species is endemic to the United States.

References

Molluscs of the United States
Monadenia
Gastropods described in 1879
Taxonomy articles created by Polbot